Australian rock group Hoodoo Gurus have released ten studio albums, thirty-seven singles, two extended plays, six compilation albums and 3 video albums. Formed in January 1981, the band was originally known as Le Hoodoo Gurus for the release of their first single, "Leilani", in October 1982. As Hoodoo Gurus, the band signed with Big Time Records and premiered their debut album, Stoneage Romeos, in March 1984. Also issued in the United States through A&M Records, the record remained atop the Alternative/College Albums Chart for four consecutive weeks, with it also becoming one of the most played albums of that year on the college network. The group's subsequent albums, Mars Needs Guitars!, Blow Your Cool! and Magnum Cum Louder, all reached the Billboard 200.

On the Australian charts Hoodoo Gurus had top ten studio albums with Mars Needs Guitars!, Blow Your Cool!, Kinky and Crank, and four top twenty singles. Both Stoneage Romeos and Mars Needs Guitars! were listed in 100 Best Australian Albums (2010). In 1992, the band released a compilation album, Electric Soup/Gorilla Biscuit, which won an ARIA Music Award for Best Cover Art, in 1993. The two-album set was certified double platinum for shipping 140,000 units. The band's seventh studio album, Blue Cave, was nominated for Best Pop Release at the 1996 ARIA Awards and charted within the top twenty in their native country. Hoodoo Gurus split in 1998 followed by the release of their live album, Bite the Bullet, later that year.

In November 2003 Hoodoo Gurus reformed and made their comeback with a new album, Mach Schau, in the following year. As of February 2005, their label, EMI, made expanded and remastered editions of all of their earlier studio albums available for purchase. At that time, Hoodoo Gurus released as well a two-DVD set, Tunnel Vision, which featured all their music videos, live material and a retrospective documentary, "Be My Guru". At that year's ARIA Awards ceremony, Tunnel Vision was nominated for Best Music DVD. In 2010, the group issued their ninth studio album, Purity of Essence, and celebrated their thirtieth anniversary by releasing a compilation album,  Gold Watch: 20 Golden Greats, through Sony Music Entertainment in 2012.

Albums

Studio albums

Live albums

Compilations

Extended plays

Singles

As lead artist

Videography

Notes

References

General

Specific

External links

 
 
 

Discography
Discographies of Australian artists
Rock music group discographies